Pietro Antonio Coppola (11 December 1793 – 13 November 1876) was an Italian composer and conductor. Born in Castrogiovanni, he was trained by his father and at the Naples Conservatory. He is chiefly known for his many operas, of which his most famous, Nina pazza per amore, premiered at the Teatro Valle in Rome in February 1835. While his works have rarely been performed after the 19th century, during his lifetime they enjoyed success in major opera houses in Italy, France, Portugal, and Spain. As a conductor he was particularly active at the Teatro Nacional de São Carlos in Lisbon. He died in Catania at the age of 82.

References

1793 births
1877 deaths
People from Enna
Italian classical composers
Italian male classical composers
Italian conductors (music)
Italian male conductors (music)
Italian opera composers
Male opera composers
19th-century classical composers
19th-century conductors (music)
19th-century Italian composers
Musicians from the Province of Enna